Mlete is a village in  the Ruvuma Region of southwestern Tanzania. It is located along the A19 road, to the east of  Songea and west of Njuga.

References

External links
Maplandia

Populated places in Ruvuma Region